Jacques Loussier (26 October 1934 – 5 March 2019) was a French pianist and composer. He arranged jazz interpretations of many of the works of Johann Sebastian Bach, such as the Goldberg Variations. The Jacques Loussier Trio, founded in 1959, played more than 3,000 concerts and sold more than 7 million recordings—mostly in the Bach series. Loussier composed film scores and a number of classical pieces, including a Mass, a ballet, and violin concertos. His style is described as third stream, a synthesis of jazz and classical music, with an emphasis on improvisation.

Early life and education 
Loussier was born on 26 October 1934 in Angers, France. He started piano lessons there at age ten. When he was eleven, he heard a piece from the Notebook for Anna Magdalena Bach. In a 2003 interview, he said, "I was studying this piece and I just fell in love with it. Then I found I loved to play the music, but add my own notes, expanding the harmonies and playing around with that music." At 13, he met pianist Yves Nat in Paris, who regularly gave him projects for three months, after which he returned for another lesson.

Career 
Loussier began composing music while studying at the Conservatoire National Musique, having moved by then to Paris, with Nat, from the age of 16. At a competition at the conservatory, he played a prelude by Bach, and when his memory failed, he improvised. He later said that he only followed a tradition, because musicians of the 18th century—including Bach—were great improvisers. Loussier played jazz in Paris bars to finance his studies. Fusing Bach and jazz was unique at the time. After six years of study, he travelled to the Middle East and Latin America, where he was inspired by different sounds. He stayed in Cuba for a year.

Early in his career, Loussier was an accompanist for singers Frank Alamo, Charles Aznavour, Léo Ferré and Catherine Sauvage. In 1959, he formed the Jacques Loussier Trio with string bass player Pierre Michelot—who had played with Django Reinhardt and the Quintette du Hot Club de France—and percussionist Christian Garros. They used Bach's compositions as a base for jazz improvisation and made many live appearances, tours, and concerts, as well as a number of recordings. They began with Decca Records but changed to Philips/Phonogram in 1973. They sold over six million albums in 15 years. Their best-known recording is "Air on the G String", which was used to advertise Hamlet cigars in the UK for over 30 years.

In the mid-1970s, the trio was dissolved. Loussier set up his own recording studio, Studio Miraval, which opened in 1977, where he worked on compositions for acoustic and electric instruments. He recorded with musicians such as Pink Floyd, Elton John, Sting, Chris Rea, and Sade. Parts of Pink Floyd's album The Wall were recorded there.

In 1985, the tricentenary of Bach's birth, Loussier revived the trio with percussionist André Arpino and bassist Vincent Charbonnier. Bassist Benoit Dunoyer de Segonzac has also played in the trio, replacing Charbonnier—whose left hand was affected by a stroke, resulting in his being unable to continue to play the bass—on a number of albums and concerts from at least as early as 1998 (on the album Satie: Gymnopédies Gnossiennes). Besides Bach, the trio recorded interpretations of compositions by Handel, Scarlatti, Vivaldi, Mozart, Beethoven, Chopin, Satie, Debussy, Ravel, and Schumann. A 2005 recording, Take Bach, by the trio with the Pekinel sisters, features adaptations of Bach's concertos for two and three pianos. Loussier's last albums, My Personal Favorites and Beyond Bach, Other Composers I Adore, were released in 2014 on the occasion of his 80th birthday.

In March 2002, Loussier filed a $10 million lawsuit against rapper Eminem and The Marshall Mathers LP executive producer Dr. Dre, claiming that the beat for the track "Kill You" was stolen from his composition Pulsion. He demanded that all sales of the album be halted and any remaining copies destroyed. The case was settled out of court.

Death 
Loussier suffered a stroke during a performance at the Klavier-Festival Ruhr on 14 July 2011 and retired from the stage. He died on 5 March 2019 at the age of 84.

Compositions 
Loussier composed the music for over 100 films, made for cinema and television series, beginning with The Happy Sixties in 1963. These included the scores for the films Heaven on One's Head (1965), Living It Up (1966), The Killing Game (1967), Dark of the Sun (1968), Monique (1970) and The Man Who Went Up in Smoke (1980), the theme tune for the popular 1960s French TV series Thierry la Fronde, and the original sign-on music for La 3e chaîne, the predecessor television channel to France 3.

Loussier also composed a trumpet concerto, two violin concertos, and music for a ballet, among other pieces. His Mass, Lumières: Messe Baroque du 21e Siècle (Lights: A Baroque Mass of the 21st Century), has been compared to Leonard Bernstein's Mass.

Recordings

Solo 
1972 Dark of the Sun (MGM)
1979 Pulsion (CBS)
1979 Pulsion / Sous la mer
1980 Fréderick Chopin par Jacques Loussier (CBS)
1982 Pagan Moon (CBS)
2004 – Impressions of Chopin's Nocturnes (Telarc CD-83602)
2013 Jacques Loussier Joue Kurt Weill (Remastered)
2014 Jacques Loussier / Concerto No. 1 for Violin and Percussion / Concerto No. 2 for Violin and Tabla / Ignacy Jan Paderewski / Sonata in A minor for Violin and Piano, Op. 13

Trio 
1959 – Play Bach No. 1 (Decca SSL 40.500)
1960 – Play Bach No. 2 (Decca SSL 40.502)
1961 – Play Bach No. 3 (Decca SSL 40.507)

1963 – Play Bach No. 4 (Decca SSL 40.516)
1965 – Play Bach aux Champs Élysées (Decca Coffret, two albums, SSL40.148)
1967 – Play Bach No. 5 (Decca SSL 40.205)
1973 – 6 Masterpieces (Philips 6321-100)

1985 – The Best of Play Bach (Start STL6) – UK No. 58
1986 – Bach to the Future (Start CD SCD2)

1987 – Bach to Bach (Start CD Original Live in Japan SMCD 19)
1988 – Brandenburg Concertos (Limelight-Japan CD 844 058-2, Decca)
1988 – The Greatest Bach (Partita No.1 in B Flat Major BWV 825, Orchestral Suite No. 2 in B Minor BWV 1067) (Limelight CD 844 059-2, Decca)
1990 – Lumières: Messe Baroque du 21ième siècle (Decca CD 425217-2)
1993 – Play Bach 93 Volume 1 (Note Productions CD 437000-2)
1994 – Play Bach Aujourd'hui Les Thèmes en Ré (Note Productions CD 437000-4)
1995 – Jacques Loussier Plays Bach (Telarc), Compilation "Play Bach 93" et "Les Thèmes en Ré" (Note Productions)

1997 – Jacques Loussier Plays Vivaldi (Telarc CD 83417)
1998 – Satie (Telarc CD 83431)
1999 – Ravel's Bolero (Telarc CD 83466)

2000 – Bach's Goldberg Variations (Telarc CD 83479)
2000 – Plays Debussy (Telarc CD 83511) 
2000 – Play Bach No. 1 (Decca 157 561–2)

2002 – Handel: Water Music & Royal Fireworks (Telarc CD 83544)
2003 – Beethoven: Allegretto from Symphony No. 7: Theme and Variations (Telarc CD-83580)
2004 – The Best of Play Bach (Telarc SACD-63590)
2005 – Mozart Piano Concertos 20/23 (Telarc CD-83628)

2007 – Encore! – Jacques Loussier Plays Bach (Telarc 83671-25)
2009 – Jacques Loussier Plays Bach: The 50th Anniversary Recording (Telarc 83693-25)
2011 – Schumann: Kinderszenen (Scenes From Childhood) (Telarc TEL-32270-02)
2014 – Beyond Bach, Other Composers I Adore (Telarc TEL-35342-02)
2014 – My Personal Favorites: The Jacques Loussier Trio Plays Bach (Telarc TEL-35319-02)

References

External links 

 
 
 Biography Concord Music Group
 Jacques Loussier (Piano, Arranger) Bach Cantatas Website
 Jacques Loussier / Bach's Instrumental Works (Recordings of Arrangements / Videos & DVD's) Bach Cantatas Website
 
 
 Review of his "Bach and more" disk on Sky Arts website
 Review of his Vivaldi disk on Sky Arts website

1934 births
2019 deaths
20th-century French composers
21st-century French composers
21st-century pianists
21st-century French male musicians
French film score composers
French jazz pianists
French male jazz musicians
French male pianists
Bach musicians
Conservatoire de Paris alumni
Crossover (music)
Jacques Loussier Trio members
People from Angers
Third stream musicians